The Health Professions Council of South Africa (HPCSA) is a statutory regulator of healthcare professions in South Africa. The council promotes healthcare, determines standards of education and training, and sets and maintains standards of ethical professional practice for professions incorporated by the Health Professions Act No. 56 of 1974.

History 
The Health Professions Council of South Africa was established in 1974 under the Health Professions Act No. 56 of 1974.  Regulation of medicine and allied professions in South Africa began in the 19th century, with the establishment of the Colonial Medical Council in the Cape Province in 1891.  The Natal Medical Council was then established in 1896, followed by the Medical and Pharmacy Council of the Orange River Colony in 1904 and the Transvaal Medical Council in 1905.

Following the formation of the Union of South Africa, the South African Medical and Dental Council (SAMDC) was formed in accordance with Act 13 of 1928 to fulfil the functions of the former provincial councils.  Act 56 of 1974 replaced Act 13 of 1928, and the HPCSA as it exists currently was formed.  The SAMDC continues as a separate legal entity.

Professions regulated by the HPCSA 
The HPCSA regulates 12 categories of healthcare professionals. They are:

All of these professions have at least one professional title that is protected by law, including those shown above. Anyone using these titles must be registered with the HPCSA. It is a criminal offence for someone to claim that they are registered with the HPCSA when they are not or to use a protected title that they are not entitled to use.

References

External links 

 

Medical and health organisations based in South Africa